2017 Nadeshiko League Cup Final was the 10th final of the Nadeshiko League Cup competition. The final was played at Nishigaoka Soccer Stadium in Tokyo on August 12, 2017. JEF United Chiba Ladies won the championship.

Overview
JEF United Chiba Ladies won their 1st title, by defeating Urawa Reds Ladies 1–0.

Match details

See also
2017 Nadeshiko League Cup

References

Nadeshiko League Cup
2017 in Japanese women's football